Elections to the Madhya Pradesh Legislative Assembly were held in February 1990. The Bharatiya Janata Party won a majority of seats and Sunderlal Patwa was sworn in as the new Chief Minister.

Result 
Source:

Elected Members

References

1990
1990
Madhya Pradesh